Madinah Slaise (Sports Chaplain) is a former professional basketball player, retired United States Air Force officer, and recipient of Hall of Fame accolades for both athletic and personal achievements, including her induction into the University of Cincinnati James P. Kelly Athletic Hall of Fame in 2016 and the Lima City School District Distinguished Alumni Hall of Fame in 2017.

Career

Basketball

College basketball 
Slaise was a four-year letterwinner at the Cincinnati (1996-2000). She ranks as the program's third all-time leading scorer with 1,849 points and averaged 21.8 ppg as a senior in 2000, the fourth-best single-season scoring average in UC history. A two-time First-Team All-Conference USA selection in 1999 and 2000, she was named to the Conference USA All-Freshman Team in 1997. She earned a spot on the C-USA All-Tournament Team in 1999 and led UC in steals in each of her four seasons, grabbing 57, 45, 85 and 70 from 1997-2000, respectively. Slaise still holds the school single-game record for free throw attempts, racking up 18 at Charlotte in 2000 and holds the UC single-season record for both free throws made (193) and attempted (242), both set in 1998-99. Slaise also holds the career marks for free throws made (503) and attempted (676) and ranks in UC's career top-10 in games played (t-9th/119), points (3rd/1,849), scoring average (6th/15.5), field goals made (8th/600), field goals attempted (3rd/1,602), 3-point field goals made (6th/146), 3-point field goals attempted (5th/497) and steals (2nd/256).

Professional basketball 
After graduating from the University of Cincinnati with a Bachelor of Arts in Communication, Madinah Slaise was selected by the Detroit Shock in the second round (No. 28 Overall) of the 2000 WNBA Draft. She played with the Shock during the 2000 season, capturing the 2nd highest player efficiency ranking (30%) for the 2000 WNBA season. She also competed overseas in France, Switzerland and Israel while launching the Madinah Slaise Youth Basketball Camp in her hometown, Lima Ohio.

Later career
Slaise joined the United States Army following the September 11, 2001 terrorist attack and served as an enlisted Trauma Medic for three years at the Womack Army Medical Center Emergency Department.

Prior to accepting a commission with the United States Air Force, she earned an associate degree and practiced as a board certified (Medical-Surgical) Registered Nurse for several years within the civilian sector.  Subsequently, accomplishing a second bachelor's degree in Nursing Science from Winston-Salem State University in 2010 (summa cum laude), she also achieved a master's degree as a Nurse Educator from Liberty University in 2016 (magna cum laude).

Madinah is an International Sports Sciences Association Certified Master Trainer, having competed as an amateur physique champion from 2010-2013. She started sports and nutrition company "Austerus FIT" in 2011, and sold it in 2016.

Slaise retired from the United States Air Force as a Major in 2018. Her officership career appointment summarization includes APU/PACU/CASF/Emergency Department Clinical Nurse, Medical Group & Squadron Executive Officer, POTUS Flight Medicine Clinic Flight Commander and Flight Nurse.

Following her athletic and military work, Slaise was accepted into a seminary program. She developed the first Christ-Centered Team Approach (CCTA) program, designed to "maximize athletic performance by nourishing the collective wellbeing of players, coaches and ancillary support systems with the employment of faith-based interventions".

References

External links
 Madinah Slaise's page from the Detroit Shock
Madinah Slaise's page in the University of Cincinnati James P. Kelly Athletics Hall Of Fame
"Life's Playbook: Lessons, Teamwork & Success," a Joint Base Andrews video, featuring Madinah Slaise, 2016
Madinah Slaise on the Hidden Brain Podcast, February 2021

Guards (basketball)
Detroit Shock players
Cincinnati Bearcats women's basketball players
Military nurses
Living people
1978 births